Events in the year 2022 in Senegal.

Incumbents 

 President: Macky Sall (since 2012)

Events 
Ongoing – COVID-19 pandemic in Senegal

May 

 26 May: A hospital fire kills 11 babies in a neonatal ward. As a result, Abdoulaye Diouf Sarr is sacked as Minister of Health.

July 

 31 July: 2022 Senegalese parliamentary election

December 

 1 December: In the National Assembly pregnant MP Amy Ndiaye is attacked by fellow MPs Mamadou Niang and Massata Samb.

Deaths 

 17 January: Karim Ouellet, 37, Senegalese-born Canadian singer-songwriter.
 18 June: Mamadou Sarr, 83, Olympic sprinter (1968).
 18 November: Youssou Diagne, 84, politician, president of the National Assembly (2001–2002).

References 

 
2020s in Senegal
Years of the 21st century in Senegal
Senegal
Senegal